East Side Historic District in Catskill, Greene County, New York is an area roughly bounded by Catskill Creek, Hudson River, and River, Harrison, Day, and Gardner Streets.  It includes 530 contributing buildings and one contributing site over a  area.  The Thomas Cole House is a National Historic Landmark and National Historic Site in the district.

It was listed on the National Register of Historic Places in 1982.

References

Historic districts on the National Register of Historic Places in New York (state)
Historic districts in Greene County, New York
National Register of Historic Places in Greene County, New York
Catskill, New York